Allgaier is a surname. Notable people with the surname include:

Justin Allgaier (born 1986), American stock car racer
Johann Baptist Allgaier (1763–1823), Austrian chess master

See also
Allgaier (company)

Surnames of German origin